Tayga is a major junction railway station on the West Siberian Railway in Russia. The biggest railway station of Tayga and one of the biggest in Russia.

History
After the completion of the Siberian Railway in Central Siberia was an unmarked junction, where the railway went to Tomsk. Later the siding was called Tomsk-Tayozhny, and in 1913, was renamed into Tayga.

The design and construction of the station was attended by Russian engineer and writer Garin-Mikhailovsky.

After construction of the bypass railway and the construction of another station in the town of Tayga (Tayga-2) for a long time, the station was called Tayga-1. However, in the 1990s after partial disassembly of a bypass road and Tayga-2 conversion in the siding, the station again became known as Tayga (without a number).

During the use of steam locomotives required much water. First it was acquired from wells and serving on the speakers using a typical water tower. But eventually the water no longer sufficed and it was necessary to build a water pipeline from the Yaya river, where a dam and a pumping station were built.

Trains
 Moscow — Vladivostok
 Moscow — Beijing
 Moscow — Ulaanbaatar
 Moscow — Tomsk
 Moscow — Khabarovsk
 Moscow — Krasnoyarsk
 Kislovodsk — Irkutsk
 Moscow — Abakan
 Moscow — Chita
 Moscow — Neryungri
 Moscow — Ulan-Ude
 Moscow — Severobaikalsk
 Adler — Krasnoyarsk
 Adler — Irkutsk
 Anapa — Tomsk
 Novokuznetsk — Tomsk

References

External links

 Train times on Yandex

Railway stations in Kemerovo Oblast
Railway stations in the Russian Empire opened in 1898
Cultural heritage monuments in Kemerovo Oblast
Objects of cultural heritage of Russia of regional significance